Alhana may refer to:

 Alhana Starbreeze, a fictional character
 Alhanadeva, 12th century Indian king
 Ajayaraja II, 12th century Indian king; called Alhana in the epic poem Hammira Mahakavya